Aleksandr Vladimirovich Rosenberg (1877–1935) was a Russian architect and author of books about architectural theory. He specialized on the planning of hospitals.

Works
1907–1916 – Peter The Great Clinical Hospital, Saint Petersburg; with Lev Ilyin and Aleksandr Klein
1912–1916 – Tallinn seafaring school (currently Tallinn English College), Tallinn; with Erich Jacoby

Books
1923 – Философия архитектуры (Philosophy of Architecture)

References

1877 births
1935 deaths
Architects from the Russian Empire
Saint-Petersburg State University of Architecture and Civil Engineering alumni